Partap Singh Bajwa is an Indian politician having served as a member of the Lok Sabha representing Gurdaspur in Punjab from 2009 to 2014. He is a Member of the Legislative Assembly for Punjab.

Early life
He is the son of Satnam Singh Bajwa who was a three-time Member of Legislative Assembly Punjab and Minister in the government of Punjab. He completed his schooling at Punjab Public School, Nabha. He started his career in politics as a student leader in 1976 became President of Youth Congress in 1982 and rose to the President of State Congress. He has served as a minister under chief ministers Beant Singh, Rajinder Kaur Bhathal, and Amarinder Singh.
Partap Singh Bajwa is Rajya Sabha member since 10 April 2016.

Career

He started his career in politics as a student leader in 1976 from DAV College, Chandigarh, became President of District Youth Congress Gurdaspur then Vice President of Youth Congress in 1980, President of Youth Congress in 1982, and rose to the President of State Congress.

Member of Legislative Assembly
He was elected to Punjab Vidhan Sabha from Kahnuwan Constituency in 1992, 2002, and 2007. He worked in various different departments under the government of Punjab.

He was Minister of State Information and Public Relations government of Punjab from 1994 to 1995, Cabinet Minister P.W.D B&R, I&PR, Government of Punjab from 1995 to 1996, Cabinet Minister Judiciary, Jails, etc. Government of Punjab from 1996 to 1997, Cabinet Minister P.W.D B&R, School Education, Govt of Punjab from 2002 to 2007.

Member of Parliament
He defeated the actor and four-time sitting MP Vinod Khanna of the Bharatiya Janata Party in general elections and became Member of Parliament in 2009 from Gurdaspur Constituency. His wife is currently the sitting Member of Legislative Assembly Punjab from the Qadian Constituency. He was made the President of the Punjab Pradesh Congress Committee  in March 2013.

Member of Legislative Assembly fourth term
He was elected to Punjab Vidhan Sabha from Qadian Constituency in 2022. He was appointed the Leader of Opposition in the Punjab assembly. The Aam Aadmi Party gained a strong 79% majority in the sixteenth Punjab Legislative Assembly by winning 92 out of 117 seats in the 2022 Punjab Legislative Assembly election. MP Bhagwant Mann was sworn in as Chief Minister on 16 March 2022.

Social work
He provides the NGO Adhaar Foundation with mobile medical vans and helps people with free medical aids, medical health check-up camps in the Gurdaspur constituency. He also has a keen interest in games and sports and serves as the President of the Judo Federation of Punjab in 2002, 2008, and again in 2015. He was elected as President of the Judo Federation of India in the year 2018.

Electoral performance

References 

 

 

India MPs 2009–2014
Living people
1957 births
Lok Sabha members from Punjab, India
Indian National Congress politicians
People from Gurdaspur district
Rajya Sabha members from Punjab, India
Punjab, India MLAs 2022–2027